Otto the Rhino is a 2013 Danish 3D computer-animated comedy film directed by  from a screenplay by Rune Schjøtt, based on the 1972 children's book of the same name by Danish children's author Ole Lund Kirkegaard. It is the third and final film in a trilogy of computer-animated films based on children's books by Kirkegaard, after Freddy Frogface (2011) and Jelly T (2012).  It was later dubbed into English and was released into several other countries.

Voice cast 
Lasse Kamper as Topper "Tops"
Nikolai Aamand as Viggo
Asta Danielsson as Sille
Lars Brygmann as Hr. Lion
Lars Knutzon as Holm
Tommy Kenter as Chief of Police
Bodil Jørgensen as Mrs. Flora
 as Mrs. Løwe
 as the teacher
Kaya Brüel as Topper's mother
Tom Jensen as Topper's father
Henrik Koefoed as Folmer
 as Almanda
Jens Jacob Tychsen as the zoo director

Release 
Otto the Rhino was released in Danish cinemas on 7 February 2013, where it grossed $2,370,662 for a total of $2,403,520. It was nominated for the Robert Award for Best Children's Film at the 31st Robert Awards.

References

External links 

2013 films
2013 computer-animated films
Danish animated films
2010s Danish-language films